The Archegos was the head of the Manichaean religion. No surviving list of every Archegos remains, and the succession procedure is unknown. Abū Hilāl al-Dayhūri is the last known Archegos. The first Archegos was the prophet Mani.

Known Archegi 

 Mani
 Mar Sisin 276-286
 Innaios negotiated the end of persecution in Mesopotamia
 Mihr
 Zad Hurmuz
 Miqlas
 Abū Hilāl al-Dayhūri

See also
 Manichaean schisms

References

Manichaeism